James Branch Bocock (March 10, 1884 – May 25, 1946) was an American football, basketball, and baseball coach. He served as the head football coach at the University of Georgia (1908), Virginia Agricultural and Mechanical College and Polytechnic Institute (VPI)—now known as Virginia Tech (1909–1910, 1912–1915), the University of North Carolina (1911), Louisiana State University (1920–1921), the University of South Carolina (1925–1926), and The College of William & Mary (1928–1930, 1936–1938), compiling a career college football record of 98–55–9. Bocock was also the head basketball coach at VPI (1909–1911, 1913–1915), LSU (1920–1921), and South Carolina (1924–1927), tallying a career college basketball mark of 109–33, and the head baseball coach at VPI (1910–1911, 1914), LSU (1922–1923), and South Carolina (1925–1927), amassing a career college baseball record of 70–54–2.

Early years
Bocock was a quarterback for the Georgetown Hoyas.

Coaching career
Although official records give Bocock credit only for coaching the Georgia Bulldogs football team in 1908, he also coached the last three games of Georgia's 1907 season. In 1907, Georgia head football coach Bull Whitney was caught in a controversy over the revelation that there were at least four paid professionals on the Georgia and Georgia Tech teams during the game played that year. As a result, Georgia removed all known ringers from its team and Whitney was forced to resign, handing the coaching duties over to Bocock for the last three games. Georgia was 2–1 in those three games.

At VPI, Bocock was the team's first true professional coach and the first head football coach to receive a full-time salary.

Later life
Bocock died at the age of 62 on May 25, 1946 at his home in Blackstone, Virginia.

Head coaching record

Football

Basketball

Baseball

See also
 List of college football head coaches with non-consecutive tenure

References

Further reading
 Reed, Thomas Walter (1949). Athens, Georgia: University of Georgia Press. History of the University of Georgia; Chapter XVII: Athletics at the University from the Beginning Through 1947 imprint pages 3493

1884 births
1946 deaths
American football quarterbacks
Georgetown Hoyas football players
Georgia Bulldogs football coaches
LSU Tigers baseball coaches
LSU Tigers basketball coaches
LSU Tigers football coaches
South Carolina Gamecocks athletic directors
South Carolina Gamecocks baseball coaches
South Carolina Gamecocks football coaches
South Carolina Gamecocks men's basketball coaches
Virginia Tech Hokies athletic directors
Virginia Tech Hokies baseball coaches
Virginia Tech Hokies football coaches
Virginia Tech Hokies men's basketball coaches
William & Mary Tribe football coaches
College men's basketball head coaches in the United States
People from Blackstone, Virginia
People from Shenandoah, Virginia
Coaches of American football from Virginia
Players of American football from Virginia
Baseball coaches from Virginia
Basketball coaches from Virginia